Billy Webb's Amazing Stories is a 1991 CBBC mini series by Steve Attridge, continuing the story of Billy Webb, a character in the book the series was based on, Alfonso Bonzo created by Andrew Davies.

In this series, every episode starts with him and a friend in a cafe and Billy would tell him about the strange happenings. Billy has been having trouble with certain items he acquires from strange people including, pancake mixture that gives his whole class hiccups, a bike which flies and a strange watch. Billy and his friend soon discover the man is the same person, who appears every time he reads a certain book. They eventually find out how to stop him and, inevitably, get rid of him. The villain is played by a different actor each week in a minor role, until the last episode where he wears a thick striped blazer like a boating one.

The series was written by Steve Attridge, who later wrote The Boot Street Band with Andrew Davies, and who then went on to write many TV shows, such as The Queen's Nose, as well as films such as GUY X, and many novels including the Murder in Mind Crime Thrillers.

Ratings (CBBC Channel)
Sunday 10 March 2002- 50,000

References

External links

1991 British television series debuts
1991 British television series endings
1990s British children's television series
BBC children's television shows
1990s British television miniseries
British television shows based on children's books
British television spin-offs
English-language television shows